Laura, formerly sometimes known as Portrait of a Young Bride, is a painting by the Italian Renaissance master Giorgione. It is  the only known painting of the author that was signed and dated by him, it has his name and the date of 1506 on the back. It hangs in the Kunsthistorisches Museum in Vienna, Austria.

Description
The portrait depicts a young woman as a bride. According to the museum it depicts Laura di Noves., but this has not been verified as fact. Like Giorgione's other works, it is unsigned, but it is one of the less controversial attributions to Giorgione. An inscription on the reverse, accepted as early 16th-century, identifies Giorgione as the painter and provides the date, making this the only work by the artist bearing a reliable date. Behind the young woman is a branch of laurel (Laurus), a symbol of chastity or of poets, and carrying the nuptial veil.  The gesture of opening the fur mantle uncovers the bosom.  This may indicate fecundity (and, therefore, maternity) as an offer of love and a marriage blessed with children.  As the laurel symbolized virtue, so the visible breast could symbolize the bride's conjugal fidelity.

It is only from the prudish perspective of the 19th or early 20th century that the baring of a breast would be viewed as meretricious.  In the 16th century, nudity did not provoke disapproval, but was shown publicly and uninhibitedly.  This painting, too, was publicly shown, probably by a proud noble who wished to celebrate his bride's attractiveness - her full build was entirely in keeping with contemporary Venetian ideals of beauty - as well as her virtue and chastity.  The laurel was considered a symbol of virtue, as seen in Lorenzo de' Medici's "impresa", where it was accompanied by the motto: "Ita ut virtus".  The veil wound about her shoulders and upper body is a bridal veil, and her bared right breast alludes to the proverbial chastity of the Amazons, who, according to antique legend, tolerated men only as a means of sexual reproduction, not, however, as a means of sexual gratification. Since contemporary morality permitted sexual reproduction only within the institution of marriage, the allusion to the Amazons implied a wife's commitment to conjugal fidelity.

Alternatively, the figure might show a courtesan— certainly many of the paintings in the Venetian tradition the Laura inspired were of figures to be read as courtesans, often posing as a mythological figure or the personification of an abstract quality.

This work marked Giorgione's abandonment of Giovanni Bellini's models to embrace a Leonardesque style.

History

The attribution of this painting is uncontroversial because it has a long and well-documented provenance. It was in the collection of the Venetian collector Bartolomeo della Nave and subsequently was purchased by Duke of Hamilton, and after his execution, by the Archduke Leopold Wilhelm of Austria, which is how it came into the museum's collection.

Notes

References
Brown, D. A., Ferino Pagden, S., Anderson, J., & Berrie, B. H. (2006). Bellini, Giorgione, Titian, and the Renaissance of Venetian painting (Washington: National Gallery of Art). 

Paintings by Giorgione
1506 paintings
Paintings in the collection of the Kunsthistorisches Museum
Portraits of women